Rakliš is a village in the municipality of Radoviš, North Macedonia. It is located roughly 2 km from the centre of Radoviš.

Demographics
According to the 2002 census, the village had a total of 570 inhabitants. Ethnic groups in the village include:

Macedonians 561
Turks 1
Serbs 2
Others 6

References

Churches 
 Sv. Konstantin I Elena (18th century)

Villages in Radoviš Municipality